Rob Flockhart is a Scottish former rugby union player. He was the 127th President of the Scottish Rugby Union.

Rugby Union career

Amateur career

He played for Boroughmuir. As SRU President he recalled this time at the Edinburgh club when opening the 2016 Melrose Sevens: "The profile of sevens has never been higher and Melrose - where I have happy memories of representing Boroughmuir in the tournament in the 1970s – continue to play their part in extending its appeal through the quality and imagination of the guest sides invited to the Greenyards."

Coaching career

Flockhart coached the Scotland U21 side in 1998 and 1999.

Referee career

He has been a citing commissioner for Six Nations Championship matches.

He as acted as a citing commissioner for European Cup and Challenge Cup matches.

He has been a citing commissioner for the Pro12.

Administrative career

He was voted a Vice-President of the Scottish Rugby Union in 2015, beating Ian Barr of Lasswade by four votes.

Flockhart became the 127th President of the Scottish Rugby Union. He served the first two-year term in office from 2016 to 2018.

On his election he said: "I am very keen, having spent this past year learning to ensure that there is strong trust, between the stakeholders, the clubs, the Council and the Board, that is where we start. That allows us to move forward with the club game to develop it and make it more sustainable. I think now what Mark Dodson and the executive team have done in making sure the professional game is on a solid footing, is fantastic. It allows us, with the debt where it is, to start thinking about how we drive forward and sustain the domestic game in Scotland."

During Flockhart's time as president the SRU received criticism for the way it handled the sacking of their Director of Rugby, Keith Russell - the father of Scotland international Finn Russell - and the introduction of 'Agenda 3' which created an Edinburgh-centric national professional league competition, the Super 6, with 3 of the 6 sides coming from the capital - and no sides from the cities of Glasgow, Aberdeen, Dundee or Inverness.

In his annual report address to the SRU delegates, Flockhart stated: "Over the last six weeks or so there’s been a cloud over Scottish Rugby, I believe caused by two things: Firstly, the findings of the employment tribunal in relation to our former director of domestic rugby Keith Russell – I want to reassure you that through Council and board we will learn the lessons from the tribunal findings, we will implement recommendations from the review undertaken by Lesley Thomson, Scotland’s former solicitor general. And I want to take this opportunity today to apologise to you all for the manner in which these matters have transpired. We must do better in this regard. Secondly, the concern and uncertainty surrounding Agenda 3. Agenda 3 was only ever a response to a recognition by many of our clubs and those volunteers in them that change is needed if our game is to survive and flourish. Ladies and gentlemen, we need to resolve these reservations, those concerns and those uncertainties and I hope that today we can go some way towards that."

He was bullish about the finances of the SRU. "It’s hugely pleasing. It helps drive Agenda 3, but the whole change in the past decade has been absolutely remarkable. The idea that we were so strung up with debt that it was difficult to do any forward planning until the debt was reduced means that the financial results allows us to show that we can handle debt and focus on future projects. There have been eight consecutive sell-outs at BT Murrayfield. 67,000 at the Samoa game. The performances of the Men’s and Women’s national teams, as well as Glasgow and Edinburgh, have all contributed to these recent figures; you don’t get to turn over £57 million unless there are big crowds at the very biggest games and successful teams are at the root of that. The turnover means that we can fund better professional teams but more importantly, we can fund club investment and the intention is to put more and more into the domestic game. The three strands of Agenda 3 – the Finance, Performance and Participation – money is needed for all of these. When I was elected I promised that I would try and brings clubs to the forefront of everything that happened at BT Murrayfield, which I think there’s no denying has been the focus. Clubs wanted change and that’s what Agenda 3 has tried to produce. There will be more discussion of course, and that’s absolutely welcome; the finance allows other things to happen."

References

Scottish rugby union players
Presidents of the Scottish Rugby Union
People educated at the High School of Dundee
Alumni of the University of Edinburgh
Boroughmuir RFC players